Ian James Rush  (born 20 October 1961) is a Welsh former professional footballer who played as a forward. At club level Rush played for Liverpool from 1980–1987 and 1988–1996. He is the club's all-time leading goalscorer, having scored a total of 346 goals in all competitions at the club. At international level, Rush made 73 appearances for the Wales national football team and remained the record goalscorer for his country until 2018, with 28 goals between 1980 and 1996.

Among the Liverpool players, Rush came 3rd in the 100 Players Who Shook The Kop – an official Liverpool fan poll. He also had short spells with Chester City, Juventus, Leeds United, Newcastle United, Sheffield United, Wrexham and Sydney Olympic. Since retiring as a player in 2000, Rush has had a stint as manager of Chester City (2004–05), and has worked as a television football pundit.

Rush was appointed Member of the Order of the British Empire in the 1996 New Year Honours for services to association football.

Club career
Born in St Asaph, Flintshire, Rush's reputation was enhanced by scoring for Chester City in a shock 2–0 FA Cup third round win at Second Division side Newcastle United in January 1980, with Chester City equalling their best run by reaching the last 16 where they narrowly lost to Ipswich Town. His last game for Chester City was a 2–1 win over Southend United at Sealand Road on 26 April 1980 in which he did not score.

Despite interest from Manchester United, and in spite of Rush being a boyhood Everton fan, Liverpool won the race to sign the 19-year-old in April 1980, though he had to remain at Chester until the end of the season as the transfer deadline (27 March 1980) had passed. Recommended by chief scout Geoff Twentyman, Liverpool paid a record fee for a teenager of £300,000. It remained Chester City's record sale until they went bankrupt in March 2010. Rush was managed throughout his time at Chester by Alan Oakes, although much of the credit for his development is given to youth manager Cliff Sear. Nearly 20 years later, Rush and Sear worked together on the coaching staff at Wrexham.

Liverpool: 1980–1987
Rush made his international début, in May 1980, just before he officially became a Liverpool player. His Liverpool début came on 13 December that year in a First Division fixture at Portman Road against Ipswich Town. He was standing in for his future strike-partner, Kenny Dalglish (out with an ankle injury but at the time one of the most highly rated strikers in the world), and wore his No 7 shirt. At this stage, Liverpool were defending the league title and also contending for the European Cup, while Ipswich were emerging as surprise title contenders. Liverpool finished fifth (with Aston Villa winning the title), but they did win the European Cup (for the third time) and the League Cup (for the first time).

The young Rush during his first season at Liverpool mostly played reserve team football rather than being thrown into the first team. His first goal for the club took time to arrive, but it eventually came on 30 September 1981 during a European Cup first round second leg tie at Anfield against Oulun Palloseura. Liverpool had already won the first leg at the Raatti Stadium 1–0. The second leg they won 7–0 with Rush scoring in the 67th minute after coming on three minutes earlier for David Johnson.

His first two league goals came on 10 October 1981 in a 3–0 home win over Leeds United, and a month later he scored in the Merseyside derby at Anfield in a 3–1 win. After Christmas however, Rush and Liverpool moved from tenth up to the top of the league. He scored a hat-trick in the 4–0 away league win over Notts County on 26 January 1982, and was on the scoresheet in both of the next two games. He managed a total of eight goals in the League Cup (one of them in the final win over Tottenham Hotspur) and three of them in the FA Cup campaign which ended in a fifth round defeat by Chelsea. He ended the season as the club's top scorer, netting 30 times in 49 appearances in all competitions, a ratio of 1 goal every 1.6 games. 17 of these goals came in the League as he helped Liverpool reclaim the League championship from Aston Villa. He also scored a goal to help Liverpool win the 1982 Football League Cup Final against Tottenham Hotspur.

He was voted PFA Young Player of the Year in 1983 after helping Liverpool to a second successive First Division/League Cup double, though once again success eluded them in the European Cup. He scored 24 League goals as Liverpool finished 11 points clear of runners-up Watford. On 6 November 1982 Rush scored four goals against Everton in a 5–0 victory, a post-war record for goals by a single player in a Merseyside derby.

Liverpool's third successive League Cup triumph in this was added through a 2–1 win over Manchester United after extra time at Wembley. He was voted PFA Player of the Year and BBC Wales Sports Personality of the Year in 1984 as Liverpool retained both the League and the League Cup and won the European Cup to complete a unique treble that season. Rush also added the Football Writers Footballer of the Year to the PFA award he had already claimed – the same feat that his strike partner Kenny Dalglish had achieved a year earlier.

He scored 47 goals in 65 games (making him the highest goalscorer in all competitions for any professional club that season), a goal every 1.4 matches, as Liverpool finished three points clear of closest rivals Southampton in the League. They beat derby rivals Everton 1–0 in the replayed final of the League Cup (after a 0–0 draw in the first ever all-Merseyside final). They also won their fourth European Cup by defeating AS Roma 4–2 on penalties (Rush made it 3–2 before Bruce Grobbelaar's famous 'jelly legs' antics) following a 1–1 draw after extra time.

The 1984–85 season was Liverpool's first trophyless season in ten years, though they did reach their fifth European Cup final against Juventus in the game of the Heysel Stadium disaster. Before the match kicked off rioting football hooligans caused a retaining wall to collapse, killing 39 Juventus supporters. The game ended in a 1–0 win for Juventus. Liverpool were beaten to the title by neighbours Everton, who were crowned champions with four matches to spare. The sequel to the Heysel disaster was an indefinite ban on all English clubs in European competition, with Liverpool set to serve an extra season once the ban was lifted on other English clubs. This meant that Rush and Liverpool were unable to compete in the 1985–86 UEFA Cup.

The 1985–86 season Rush scored twice as Liverpool beat Southampton 2–0 in the FA Cup semi-final at White Hart Lane, booking a place at Wembley to face Everton in the first all-Merseyside FA Cup final. Liverpool had pipped their city rivals to the League title (which had also been contested with the likes of West Ham United and Manchester United) by beating Chelsea 1–0 at Stamford Bridge. Everton opened the scoring when Gary Lineker outpaced Alan Hansen to shoot past Grobbelaar at the second attempt and held this lead until half-time. In the second half Liverpool drew level in the 57th minute when Rush latched onto a pass from Jan Mølby to round Everton goalkeeper Bobby Mimms and slot the ball into an empty net. Six minutes later, Mølby was again at the heart of another attack. Picking the ball up inside the Everton penalty area, he drilled a cross for Craig Johnston to score. Liverpool were now 2–1 up, but the game was in the balance until the 84th minute, when Ronnie Whelan led another attack. With the game stretched, he picked the ball up and drove towards the edge of the Everton area. Dalglish made a run across his path into space, but Whelan used it as a dummy and clipped a pass over three Everton defenders into the path of Rush who, from the angle of the six-yard area, scored past Mimms. Liverpool held on to win 3–1 and completed the first League and FA Cup double in the club's history. Rush added the Man of the Match award to his winner's medal. However, the ban on English clubs in European competition was continued, and Liverpool were unable to enter 1986–87 European Cup.

Since Dalglish's appointment as player manager in the 1985 close season, Rush had often found himself partnered with Paul Walsh in the Liverpool first team as Dalglish selected himself as a player less frequently.

Juventus: 1987–1988
After attracting much interest from top European sides, Rush accepted an offer to sign for Italian club Juventus on 2 July 1986 for a British record transfer fee of £3.2m. However, he continued to play at Liverpool for one season on loan before making his début for Juventus. He was the second highest goalscorer in the Football League for the 1986–87 season with 30 First Division goals, but failed to win any major trophies as Liverpool finished second to Everton in the league and were defeated by Arsenal in the League Cup final despite Rush's opening goal, a result that also ended a long sequence – Liverpool had not lost any of the previous 144 games in which he had scored.

However, it was viewed as a new challenge for Rush who would have the task of unlocking the much tighter defences in Serie A. His time at Juventus was less than successful, as he scored only eight times in 29 games; though this was partly explained by the Italian tradition at this time of tighter defences meaning that strikers tended to score fewer goals in Italy than they did in England.

It has been said that he had a hard time settling in Turin, and that once he remarked "It's like living in a foreign country." However, he has denied both the feeling and the quote, stating as "absolutely untrue" that he was homesick and did not enjoy his time in Turin. "I was homesick at times, but it is one of the best things I've done in my life". In his autobiography Rush says that the quote was a joke made up by Kenny Dalglish, then in an interview published in The Irish Times in 2008, claimed that the quote was fictional.

After just one season at the Stadio Comunale, he returned to Anfield, rejoining Liverpool for £2.7m on 18 August 1988 – a record signing for an English club at the time, which remained unbroken for three years. It was the third time that summer that the national transfer record had been broken. The news of Rush's imminent return was given to Liverpool fans before they journeyed south to London for yet another Charity Shield match. Before the game started, they were in full voice. However, this time they had a new song: "Rushie is back, Rushie is back". Although the Liverpool team of 1987–88 had played some outstanding football, such was Rush's stature amongst the Anfield faithful, they were pleased to see him return to the club.

Rush's departure from Liverpool had sparked the acquisition of new strikers John Aldridge (whose physical resemblance to Rush was often remarked upon) and Peter Beardsley, and on his return to the Liverpool side he was partnered alongside these players to form a 4–3–3 formation. Rush's former strike partner Kenny Dalglish (who had been appointed player-manager in 1985) was still registered as a player but by then he was in his 37th year and rarely played in the first team, retiring completely in 1990. Rush published a diary of his frustrating time in Italy titled My Italian Diary, 1989. In it, he reflected on his struggles to integrate himself in the dressing room at Juventus and adapt to the Italian style of play.

Liverpool (second spell): 1988–1996

On his return to Anfield, Rush had serious competition for a place in the new-look Liverpool attack, with John Aldridge having arrived at the club just before Rush's move to Juventus and Peter Beardsley having arrived shortly afterwards. It was deemed that Rush and Aldridge were too similar in style to be able to play together. Aldridge started the season in front of Rush and consistently scored goals, thus keeping the Welshman on the bench. As the season progressed, Rush came into some form. Rush had again scored twice against Everton in a thrilling 3–2 win in the 1989 FA Cup Final. He came off the bench to replace Aldridge, who had opened the scoring for Liverpool in the fourth minute of the game. The sides were locked at 1–1 after 90 minutes, but Rush put Liverpool ahead in the fourth minute of extra time. Everton midfielder Stuart McCall then brought the scores level for a second time, but Rush came up with the goods once more with an incisive finish in the 103rd minute to win the Cup for Liverpool.

The 1989 FA Cup Final carried even greater significance because of the events of 15 April that year. In the semi-final, Liverpool had been drawn against Nottingham Forest at Hillsborough, home of Sheffield Wednesday. However, the game was brought to an abrupt end at 3.06 pm due to the unfolding disaster. 94 fans were crushed to death that day, with the final death toll eventually reaching 97. Rush, along with his teammates, attended many of the funerals.

Rush featured in the 1989 League title decider against Arsenal at Anfield. The Gunners needed to win by a two-goal margin to become champions, with a last-minute Michael Thomas goal famously giving them the title. Rush was injured during the first half of the game and had to be replaced by Peter Beardsley.

At the end of that season, UEFA voted for the ban on English teams in European competitions to continue for at least one more season, meaning that Rush and his teammates would be unable to challenge for the Cup Winners' Cup.

The 1989–90 season saw Rush win another League title, his fifth and last, as Liverpool finished nine points clear of Aston Villa, with Rush scoring 18 times in 36 games. However, another bid for the League–FA Cup double failed as Liverpool suffered a shock FA Cup semi-final defeat to Crystal Palace, even though Rush had given the Liverpool the lead with a goal in the 14th minute. The game ended in a 4–3 defeat, even more incredible considering that Liverpool had crushed the newly promoted South Londoners 9–0 in a league game earlier in the season.

Although the ban on English clubs in European competition was lifted for the 1990–91 season, Liverpool were unable to compete in the European Cup as UEFA ruled that they would have to serve an extra year's suspension.

1990–91 saw Rush continue to score regularly and Liverpool led the table from the start of the season until January, having won their opening eight league games, but they were then overhauled by Arsenal and on 22 February 1991 Dalglish announced his resignation as manager. He was replaced by Graeme Souness but the change of manager was not enough to prevent the league title from slipping away from Anfield. Shortly after Dalglish's resignation, Liverpool were eliminated from the FA Cup in the fifth round by neighbours Everton, seeing their double hopes eliminated for the fourth season running (though this time at a much earlier stage). However, Liverpool finished second and were finally readmitted to European competition, qualifying for the UEFA Cup and giving Rush and his teammates their first chance of European action since 1984–85.

In 1992, he picked up a third FA Cup winners' medal, scoring Liverpool's second goal, in the 67th minute, in the 2–0 win against Second Division Sunderland at Wembley. This gave Rush and his colleagues another chance of European football, this time in the shape of the Cup Winners' Cup. It was a successful end to a season where Rush had struggled with injuries, and Liverpool had finished sixth in the league. However, his third goal came in a crucial 2–0 home win over Manchester United on 26 April 1992 which denied their arch-rivals the championship, the title going instead to Leeds United – the conclusion to a campaign where the title challenge had been mostly a two-horse race in which Liverpool had merely been on the fringes. Surprisingly, this was the first time he had scored against Manchester United. Liverpool managed only a sixth-place finish in the league that season, the first time since 1981 that they had not finished champions or runners-up.

1992–93 was perhaps Liverpool's hardest season since beginning their current top flight tenure in 1962. They failed to mount a challenge for the new Premier League title, and as late as March they stood 15th in the table. Dismal form in the league had seen Rush dropped from the starting line-up, having scoring only three league goals by the beginning of March, with Souness favouring the likes of Ronny Rosenthal and Paul Stewart, but Rush returned to his peak during the final weeks of the season with 11 goals during the final two months, and he finished the season as the club's top scorer with 14 league goals. He topped the goalscoring charts once again in 1993–94, beginning the season with Nigel Clough as his strike-partner until the brilliant young Robbie Fowler broke into the first team. It was another disappointing season for Liverpool, however, as they continued to perform unremarkably in the Premier League and manager Graeme Souness stepped down in late January following a shock FA Cup exit at the hands of Bristol City. Long-serving coach Roy Evans took over as manager. Liverpool finished eighth in the league, once again missing out on European competition.

Rush picked up his fifth League Cup winner's medal in 1995, when two goals from Steve McManaman saw off a spirited challenge from outsiders Bolton Wanderers, as Liverpool triumphed 2–1. Earlier in the competition Rush scored a hat-trick as Liverpool beat Blackburn Rovers at Ewood Park, the team who would go on to win the Premier League that season. Liverpool themselves achieved their best league finish since 1991, as they finished fourth in the Premier League.

The 1995 close season saw Liverpool pay a national record fee of £8.4million for Nottingham Forest striker Stan Collymore, putting Rush's future at Anfield - and most of all his place in the first team - under doubt. However, he began the season as Liverpool's first choice striker alongside Collymore, only to be replaced by Robbie Fowler as Collymore's regular partner after a few games.

Inevitably, his loss of a regular place in the first team sparked rumours of a transfer during the season. Peter Reid made an offer to Liverpool to sign Rush on loan for Division One promotion challengers Sunderland in January 1996, but Liverpool manager Roy Evans rejected this offer, despite having not fielded Rush in his first eleven for two months, saying that he needed Rush as cover for Fowler and Collymore, as Liverpool began their quest for the FA Cup and were distant challengers in the league title race.

In late February 1996, it was announced that Rush would be leaving Anfield on a free transfer when his contract expired on 1 June. Numerous clubs were quick to express an interest in signing him. These included Everton, Sunderland, Oldham Athletic, Swansea City, Leeds United and Tranmere Rovers.

His long association with Liverpool ended with a substitute appearance in the 1996 FA Cup Final against Manchester United.  A hugely disappointing game looked to be heading for extra time and even a replay until Eric Cantona popped up with a late winner to give the Old Trafford side a 1–0 victory.

Later career:  1996–2000
Rush bid farewell to Anfield on 20 May 1996 when he agreed to sign for Leeds United. Rush spent a season with Leeds and scored three times in 36 Premier League games and was given a free transfer at the end of the 1996–97 campaign. 

He had been brought to Elland Road by manager Howard Wilkinson, who was sacked only a month into the season to be replaced by George Graham. 

He then linked up with Kenny  Dalglish at Newcastle United on a one-year contract but lost his place in the side after Christmas, when Alan Shearer returned from a long-term injury. However, Rush did score an important goal in a 1–0 win over Everton in the 3rd round of the FA Cup, his 44th in the competition (a 20th-century record). He scored one other goal for Newcastle in a League Cup tie with Hull City.

He went on loan to Sheffield United later in the season, before leaving St James's Park in the summer of the year 1998 to sign, amid much fanfare, for Wrexham. The 37-year-old less athletic Rush failed to score in 17 Division Two starts for the North Wales club, and was moved into midfield near the end of the season. He made a brief playing comeback with Sydney Olympic in Australia, scoring one goal in three games, before finally retiring, aged 38, in 2000 ending an illustrious career.

International career

Rush made his Welsh debut before he had been handed his first start for Liverpool, playing his first match on 21 May 1980 against Scotland in Glasgow, a 0–1 loss. He played his last international match on 24 January 1996 – a friendly match against Italy in Terni which Wales lost 0–3. Rush played regularly for the Welsh national team for more than 15 years, scoring 28 goals in 73 games.

He scored in a friendly against Italy in Brescia on 4 June 1988, the only goal in a shock win. During his career the team never qualified for a major tournament, although in 1991 he scored the winning goal in a memorable Euro 1992 qualifier against Germany on 5 June 1991. On 9 October 1992, he netted a hat-trick in a 6–0 win over the Faroe Islands at Cardiff Arms Park in 1994 FIFA World Cup qualification, the first Welsh hat-trick in over 13 years, and one of only 14 in the nation's history. Rush was Wales' record goalscorer until 2018 when his record of 28 goals was surpassed by Gareth Bale.

Management and coaching
After working as a part-time striker's coach for Liverpool under Gerard Houllier in 2003, he was appointed manager of his first professional club, Chester City (by this time in Football League Two), in August 2004. Chester had made a dreadful start to their first season back in the Football League and Rush had a hard time at the helm. After losing 3–1 at Boston United in their first game in charge, they strung together a two-month unbeaten run and he led the club to the FA Cup third round. Rush seemed to be answering his critics, including former Liverpool teammate Mark Lawrenson, who doubted whether his tactical and coaching abilities could match his striking history.

But after Rush ruled himself out of the running for the vacant Welsh manager's job on 1 November 2004 things never seemed to go as well. Several heavy defeats were inflicted and Rush was criticised for long-ball tactics  his managerial team opted to use. Despite pressure from chairman Stephen Vaughan, Rush refused to resign after a humiliating 5–0 loss to neighbours Shrewsbury Town in February 2005. But when Vaughan sacked Rush's assistant Mark Aizlewood in April, after a 1–0 defeat at Darlington, without his knowledge, Rush resigned on principle. By the point of his resignation, Chester were virtually safe from relegation. His spell in charge saw youngsters such as Robbie Booth, Michael Walsh and Shaun Whalley all given their Football League debuts, while players including Michael Brown, George Elokobi and Robbie Foy all spent time on loan at the club.

Rush was interviewed for the Peterborough United manager's job shortly after this but lost out to Mark Wright, who had played in the same Liverpool team as Rush from 1991 to 1996, and had preceded Rush as Chester manager.

Media career and other activities, 2005 to present

In 2005, at the age of 43, Rush considered coming out of retirement to play for TNS, after the Welsh side were drawn against Liverpool for their opening round Champions League qualifying match, but later decided against this.

Since November 2005, Rush has been involved in media work within the game, including a stint as an analyst with ESPN. He also appears as a pundit and reporter for Sky Sports and Sky Sports News. He has also done work on LFC TV.

On 27 April 2006, Rush was involved in the Marina Dalglish charity match, which pitted the 1986 FA Cup final teams of Liverpool and Everton against each other in aid of Breast Cancer Research, as Kenny Dalglish's wife Marina had been suffering from breast cancer and the proceeds from the match were being donated to the charity.

Rush was inducted into the English Football Hall of Fame in 2006 due to his achievements in the game.

On 7 September 2007 it was announced that Rush had been appointed Elite Performance Director for the Welsh Football Trust, a part-time role in which he would help develop the next generation of players for Wales' national teams.

Rush released his autobiography on 21 August 2008, Rush: The Autobiography, through Ebury Press.

On 26 April 2010, it was announced that Rush had returned to work with Liverpool FC, becoming the Club's new Soccer Schools Ambassador and it was announced he would also work with the Club's commercial team to help develop and support partnerships with other global sponsors and brands. Rush can still be seen wearing the red of Liverpool as he is one of Liverpool's ambassadors on public relations tours for the club.

In summer 2010, as part of an outdoor installation in Chester that featured seventy life sized fibreglass rhinos each with unique artwork, one rhino was in honour of Ian Rush. The rhino was painted with a black moustache and wearing a Chester City football kit and boots. 

In August 2014, Rush was one of 200 public figures who were signatories to a letter to The Guardian opposing Scottish independence in the run-up to September's referendum on that issue.

Rush was one of the pundits in first season (2014) of Indian Super League.

In August 2016, Rush was named as ambassador for the 2017 UEFA Champions League Final, which took place in Cardiff, Wales.

In popular culture 
Rush is referenced in the Milk Marketing Board television advert Accrington Stanley, Who Are They?, which ran in the late 1980s and early 1990s.

Personal life
Ian Rush was the ninth of ten children born to Francis and Doris Rush, who lived in Flint, North Wales. Francis Rush, who worked in the steel industry for many years, died in July 2003 at the age of 78. Doris Rush died almost seven years later at the age of 82.

Rush married Tracy in 1987. The marriage ended in 2015. They had two sons together: Jonathan and Daniel.

He is the great-uncle of footballer Owen Beck, who made his debut for Liverpool in 2021 and is currently on loan at Bolton Wanderers.

Career statistics

Honours
Source:

Liverpool
 Football League First Division (5): 1981–82, 1982–83, 1983–84, 1985–86, 1989–90
 FA Cup (3): 1985–86, 1988–89, 1991–92
 League Cup (5): 1980–81, 1981–82, 1982–83, 1983–84, 1994–95
 Football League Super Cup (1): 1985-86
 FA Charity Shield (4): 1982, 1986 (shared), 1989, 1990 (shared)
 European Cup (2): 1980–81, 1983–84

Individual
 PFA Young Player of the Year (1): 1983
 PFA Players' Player of the Year (1): 1984
 FWA Footballer of the Year (1): 1984
 BBC Wales Sports Personality of the Year (1): 1984
 PFA First Division Team of the Year (5): 1983, 1984, 1985, 1987, 1991
 PFA Team of the Century (1977-1996): 2007
 European Golden Boot (1): 1984
 First Division Golden Boot (1): 1984
 Liverpool Top Goalscorer (8): 1981–82, 1982–83, 1983–84, 1985–86, 1986–87, 1990–91, 1992–93, 1993–94
 FAI International Football Awards – International Personality: 2010

Bibliography
 
 Paperback (2009):

References

External links

Wales Goalscoring Record
LFC History Profile
60 Minutes with Ian Rush Interview
 

1961 births
Association football forwards
Chester City F.C. managers
Chester City F.C. players
English Football Hall of Fame inductees
English Football League managers
English Football League players
Expatriate footballers in Italy
Expatriate soccer players in Australia
First Division/Premier League top scorers
Juventus F.C. players
Leeds United F.C. players
Liverpool F.C. non-playing staff
Liverpool F.C. players
Living people
Members of the Order of the British Empire
National Soccer League (Australia) players
Newcastle United F.C. players
People educated at St Richard Gwyn Catholic High School, Flint
Sportspeople from Flintshire
Premier League players
Serie A players
Sheffield United F.C. players
Sportspeople from St Asaph
Sydney Olympic FC players
UEFA Champions League winning players
Wales international footballers
Welsh expatriate footballers
Welsh expatriate sportspeople in Australia
Welsh expatriate sportspeople in Italy
Welsh football managers
Welsh footballers
Wrexham A.F.C. players
FA Cup Final players